Emánuel Moór (19 February 1863 – 20 October 1931) was a Hungarian composer, pianist, and inventor of musical instruments.

Moór was born in Kecskemét, Hungary, and studied in Prague, Vienna and Budapest.  Between 1885 and 1897 he toured Europe as a soloist and ventured as far afield as the United States.  Besides five operas and eight symphonies his output amounted to 151 opuses and also included: concertos for piano (4), violin (4), cello (2), viola, and harp; a triple concerto for violin, cello, and piano; chamber music; a requiem; and numerous lieder. He died, aged 68, in Chardonne, Switzerland.

His best-known invention was the Emánuel Moór Pianoforte, which consisted of two keyboards lying one above each other and allowed, by means of a tracking device, one hand to play a spread of two octaves. The double keyboard pianoforte was promoted extensively in concerts throughout Europe and the United States by Moór's second wife, the British pianist Winifred Christie.

In 1921, Marie Tutundjian [de Vartavan] (born de Jarowslawska, 18.05.1887-20.11.1963) took a large part in the experiments with the Duplex-Coupler piano imagined by Emánuel Moór. Marie was a very talented pianist who had been playing in public since the age of twelve and had even had the privilege of playing in duet with Paderewski Ignacy Jan Paderewski. She was married to the Armenian WWI hero and writer Levon Tutundjian [de Vartavan] and lived in Lausanne with him in Cornette de Bise. She taught at the Ribeaupierre Institute, a higher music school in Lausanne founded in 1915 by Mathilde and Émile de Ribeaupierre. The same year Emánuel Moór sparked a lively controversy in the world of music by presenting two revolutionary inventions in quick succession. First, "a giant violin, one and a half meters long, with five to six strings to reach the length of the cello, the bow being moved by a pedal". The possibility of his employment in the orchestra prompted ironic comments from a critic of the Lausanne Gazette. Marie, for her part, worked with Moor's wife, Winifred Christie, to operate the second invention, a piano with two keyboards, the lower keyboard of which has its raised white keys to allow chromatic glissando and a pedal intermediate coupling the two keyboards - not to mention an ingenious system which made it possible to imitate a harpsichord. Marie Tutundjian played with it on 03-11-1921 at the Palace of Montreux and at least once again on 16-11-1921 [La Musique dans le Canton de Vaud (1904-1938), p. 146. See pages 251, 252 on Marie Tutundjian/de Jarowslawska], but these trials, if they left a trace in music history were not repeated [Encyclopédie de la musique, 2e partie, vol. 3, p. 2080-2081].

On a scholarship from Winnifred Christie Moór Timothy Baxter, then a student (later a professor) at The Royal Academy of Music, in 1964 wrote Six bagatelles for double Keyboard. The work was performed by Jeffery Harris on 24 August 1976 in the Three Choirs Festival in Hereford plus BBC broadcast about the same time. Jeffery Harris held the Winnifred Christie Moór Scholarship at the Royal Academy of Music before Timothy Baxter. The scholarship stopped, when Winnifred Christie died after an accident in her home. Timothy Baxter has also written some arrangements for the instrument because of its interesting possibilities. The Six Bagatelles were later arranged for two pianos with a first performance in Arcueille during Festival Erik Satie on 17 May 2013, the birthday of Erik Satie, played by Elsa Sorvari and Viktor Bogino. They also in 2013 played the work twice more, one of them in Paris. The Bagatelles have since been played a number of times in Denmark. They are published by Edition-S.dk and can be found on Timothy Baxter's portrait CD from 2015 played by the pianists Anne Mette Stæhr and Ulrich Stærk.

Maurice Ravel said that the Emánuel Moór Pianoforte produced the sounds he had really intended in some of his works, if only it had been possible to write them for two hands playing on a standard piano. Anatoly Brandukov, dedicatee of Moór's Cello Sonata No. 2 in G major, Op. 55, introduced the composer to Pablo Casals. Casal's first meeting is recorded in nearly every biography about Casals. In his own words Casals said, "His music was overwhelming….and the more he played, the more convinced I became that he was a composer of the highest order. When he stopped, I said simply, ‘You are a genius.’" This meeting was the beginning of a long friendship between the two with Casals performing and premiering Moór's compositions, several of which were dedicated to Casals. For example, Casals gave four performances of the Cello Sonata No. 2 in G Major in December 1905 alone following his initial meeting with the composer earlier in the year. Casals's first noted performance of this sonata came during a Russian tour (pianist not noted) followed by two performances with Marie Panthès in Geneva and Lausanne and one performance in Paris with Alfred Cortot at the piano.  Casals also championed other of Moór's works, performing multiple sonatas, a concerto that Moór dedicated to him, a double cello concerto, and a triple concerto for piano trio with orchestra.

Moór and Christie also collaborated on a book of technical exercises for the instrument.

Notes

External links
Biography and list of works 
An article from The New York Times about the Duplex-Coupler Grand Pianoforte
Emanuel und Henrik Moór foundation 

Audio recording of Moór playing a "Hungarian Melody", recorded 1889 (Thomas Edison National Historical Park)
Library of Congress Name Authority File
WorldCat Identities
Boston Symphony Orchestra Program Archives - See Page 34 for bio. His piano concerto, Op 57 was performed (pre-duplex coupler piano).

1863 births
1931 deaths
19th-century classical composers
19th-century Hungarian musicians
19th-century male musicians
20th-century classical composers
20th-century Hungarian musicians
20th-century Hungarian male musicians
Hungarian classical composers
Hungarian classical pianists
Male classical pianists
Hungarian inventors
Hungarian male classical composers
Hungarian Romantic composers
People from Kecskemét